György Jendrassik or in English technical literature: George Jendrassik (1898 Budapest – 1954 London) was a Hungarian physicist and mechanical engineer.

Jendrassik completed his education at Budapest's József Technical University, then at the University of Berlin attended lectures of the famous physicists Albert Einstein and Max Planck. In 1922 he obtained his diploma in mechanical engineering in Budapest. From 1927 he worked at Ganz Rt, where he helped to develop diesel engines, of which the first few pieces were made with single and double cylinders; later, the 4- and 6-cylinder four-stroke versions were developed, without compression and with mixing chamber.

Diesel Engines

He started working at Ganz and Company - Danubius Electricity, Machine, Waggon and Shipyard Ltd. He started his activities within the Study Department, which was the development and experimental department. His first work included the strength calculation and preparation of the load tests for the main girders of a new type of wagon for the Dutch coastal local railways. At this time the main focus of the Study Department was the development of a medium-speed semi-diesel engine. This gave Jendrassik the opportunity to study the theoretical and practical problems of the diesel engine. Jendrassik's interest soon turned to the development of diesel engines. He developed a number of patents which laid the foundations for the development of small and medium-performance diesel engines for use in vehicles. After two years of development work, the Jm 130 single-cylinder engine was produced in 1927. It had a bore of 130 mm, a stroke of 160 mm, and produced 12 hp at 1000 rpm with a specific consumption of 210 grams. This was later developed into two-, four- and six-cylinder versions, which were stable, suitable for rail and marine propulsion, and which featured a combustion chamber in the front. In 1927, seeing the success of the diesel engines, Jendrassik developed the first patents and engines within the Study Department, but in the summer of 1927 the independent Jendrassik Engine Construction Department was established. This department continued to operate after Jendrassik's death until the end of 1958. The Ganz-Jendrassik engines were the start of the motorisation of the railways, but diesel engines were also used in shipping and road vehicles.

Its patents were bought by several major engine manufacturers, including the Spanish Hispano-Suiza and the British Vickers, which were the leading engine manufacturers at the time. Jendrassik was fluent in German, French, English and Spanish. He set up a private office in 1934, where he and his colleagues designed a six-cylinder V-type diesel engine for Hispano-Suiza in 1934. He also maintained his own office alongside Ganz Rt. In 1934, he married Johanna Schmall, the eldest daughter of Henrik Schmall, a qualified architect. The increasingly perfected Jendrassik engines became known all over the world and enhanced the reputation of Hungarian industry, the Ganz factory and not least György Jendrassik. In addition to his constant engine development activities, he was also involved in the realisation of gas turbines. In his private office, the thermodynamic calculations for the future gas turbine were carried out.

Turboprop

Later on he worked on gas turbines and in order to speed up research, he established the Invention Development and Marketing Co. Ltd. in 1936. The next year he ran an experimental gas turbine engine of 100 hp.

He next began work on a turboprop engine, which would emerge as the CS-1 prototype, produced and tested in the Ganz works in Budapest. Of axial-flow design with 15-stage compressor and 7-stage turbine, it incorporated many modern features. With predicted output of 1,000 bhp at 13,500 rpm the Cs-1 stirred interest in the Hungarian aircraft industry with its potential to power a modern generation of high-performance aircraft, and construction was begun of a twin-engined fighter-bomber, the Varga RMI-1 X/H, to be powered by it. Its first bench run took place in 1940, making it the world's first turboprop engine to run. However combustion problems were experienced which limited the output to around 400 bhp. Development was discontinued in 1941 when agreement was reached to manufacture the Daimler-Benz DB 605 engine in Hungary.

Jendrassik's reputation continued to grow, and he became the factory's managing director from 1942 to 1945. In recognition of his scientific work he was elected in 1943 corresponding member of the Hungarian Academy of Sciences. After the war he was not able to continue developing gas turbines. As a successful entrepreneur, Political distrust surrounded him in the new communist-dominated Hungary. After a spell in Argentina, he came to London in 1948 to become consultant and director to Metropolitan Railcars Ltd., controlled by Metropolitan Cammell and Metropolitan-Vickers. Since 1949, Jendrassik has also been an external consultant of Power Jets (Research and Development) Ltd., with which company he was working until his death, on the development of a pressure exchanger; this is a promising type of heat engine in which the compression and expansion of a gaseous medium is effected by direct action of the gases involved without the employment of mechanical parts such ad pistons or blades The number of his inventions on record only in Hungary is 77. His last invention of great importance was the pressure-compensating device for jet engines at the Power Jets Ltd.

Patents in Hungary
During his lifetime, he has been listed on 60 patent applications in Hungary:

References

20th-century Hungarian inventors
Hungarian mechanical engineers
20th-century Hungarian physicists
Jet engine pioneers
1898 births
1954 deaths